Crítica de la Argentina was a daily newspaper from Buenos Aires, Argentina.

Origin 
The name was a throwback to a Crítica originally published between 1913 and 1962, which, during the 1920s, was the most widely circulated in Latin America.

History 
It was founded on March 2, 2008, by prominent local journalist Jorge Lanata, and initially enjoyed a circulation of over 80,000 copies. Its rapid decline, to around 6,000, and differences with the paper's majority stakeholder, Antonio Mata, led Lanata to resign as editor in April 2009 (he continued to contribute columns).

After Lanata's resignation, it was directed by a group conformed by Nerina Sturgeon, Alejandro Bianchi, Daniel Álvarez, Silvio Santamarina and Daniel Capalbo. The news daily failed to recover, however, and amid a strike resulting from unpaid salaries, Crítica ceased publication on April 30, 2010.

References

External links
Employees' blog

2008 establishments in Argentina
2010 disestablishments in Argentina
Defunct newspapers published in Argentina
Mass media in Buenos Aires
Daily newspapers published in Argentina
Newspapers established in 2008
Publications disestablished in 2010
Spanish-language newspapers